The 1999 British Grand Prix was a Formula One motor race held on 11 July 1999 at the Silverstone Circuit near Silverstone, England. It was the eighth race of the 1999 Formula One season. The 60-lap race was won by McLaren driver David Coulthard after he started from third position. Eddie Irvine finished second for the Ferrari team and Williams driver Ralf Schumacher came in third.

Jacques Villeneuve and Alessandro Zanardi both stalled on the grid causing a race restart.

While the red flags were out, Michael Schumacher crashed at Stowe corner due to brake failure, breaking his leg.  This would keep him out of Formula One until the Malaysian Grand Prix, ending his championship hopes.

Following a difficult season Damon Hill performed well to finish 5th in his home race and seemed happy enough to carry on for the rest of the season. He had also briefly led the race for a lap, which was the last time he would lead a Grand Prix.

This was Toranosuke Takagi's final classified Formula One race finish. He failed to finish each of his subsequent eight races.

This was McLaren team's first British Grand Prix victory since 1989.

Classification

Qualifying

Race

Championship standings after the race

Drivers'  Championship standings

Constructors'  Championship standings

 Note:    Only the top five positions are included for both sets of standings.

References

External links

British Grand Prix
British Grand Prix
Grand Prix
British Grand Prix